Serbian White Eagles Football Club ( / Fudbalski klub Srpski beli orlovi) is a Canadian soccer team. The team is a member of the Canadian Soccer League, an unsanctioned soccer league.

The team's home kit is all white commemorating the white double-headed eagle which appears on the Serbian flag while the away colours are red-blue-white commemorating the tricolour of the Serbian flag. The colour white was also chosen as it symbolizes purity and innocence. The club also has teams in the Canadian Soccer League Reserve Division and the Ontario Soccer League.

The club was established in 1968 under the name Hamilton Serbia and joined the professional ranks in 1970 by becoming a member in the National Soccer League, eventually relocating to Toronto and becoming the Serbian White Eagles. The White Eagles had their first taste of success in 1974, and became the first Canadian soccer club to compete in the CONCACAF Champions' Cup. In 1981, they withdrew from the NSL and became an amateur club in the process. After a 25-year hiatus from professional soccer, they returned in 2006 to compete in the Canadian Soccer League (the successor league to the NSL).

Their return was a success as they dominated the league in both performance and attendance. Within their first four seasons they become the second club in CSL history to reach the CSL Championship final in four consecutive seasons. During those four seasons they produced three division titles, and a championship. In regards to league attendance they averaged the highest number of spectators, which revived their derby match against their rivals Toronto Croatia.

Shortly after, the team's performance went into a decline but they still maintained their powerhouse status as they continued to consecutively qualify for the playoffs. In 2015, the White Eagles began rejuvenating their performance by claiming that year's regular season title, the championship in 2016, and the regular season title in 2022.

History

Early years (1968–1980) 

The Serbian White Eagles were established in 1968 (although earlier believed to be in 1970) in Hamilton, Ontario as Hamilton Serbia and played under that name for a time. In these beginnings, the club was a semi-professional club in the National Soccer League, until 1980.

Prior to the 1973 season, the team imported nine players from Yugoslavia. Tragedy struck the team on June 10, 1973, when 25-year-old forward Alexander Zivaljevic was killed in a car accident on the Queen Elizabeth Way in Toronto. The driver of the car, 24-year-old Niko Skrvic, was also killed when he lost control of the car. Injured in the crash were Eagles players Verko Mitrovic and Ljubo Dimic. 30-year-old Mitrovic suffered a crushed chest and was paralyzed from the waist down, while 26-year-old Dimic suffered a fractured skull and a kidney injury.

The team qualified for the 1975 CONCACAF Champions' Cup where they lost to Mexican team CF Monterrey in the first round after a brawl on the pitch for which the team received a suspension. In 1981, the Serbian White Eagles withdrew from the league, becoming an amateur club in the process.

Rebirth and instant success (2006) 

They remained an amateur club until February 2006, when they joined the Canadian Soccer League, becoming one of the most successful expansion clubs in the league's history. Prior to the start of the 2006 Canadian Soccer League season, it was announced that the legendary Dragoslav Šekularac would become head coach of the expansion side with first assistant being Stevan Mojsilović. Other big names were brought in as well to help re-build the team. These included (among others): club legend Mike Bakic as president of the club, the director of player personnel was another club legend Mike Stojanovic, the general manager was Ken Stanojević who (along with Gojko Paić) was GM during the club's heyday in the 1970s while the director of football was Nenad Stojkov. This was Šekularac's second stint with the White Eagles having already played for and coached them in the past. With seasoned internationals being brought over from Serbia and the rest of Europe, the team was set.

The roster assembled by Šekularac consisted of players with European experience and CSL veterans. The players brought in were Saša Viciknez, Dušan Belić, Siniša Ninković, Dragan Radović, Niki Budalic, Božo Milić, Uroš Predić, Nenad Stojčić, Mirko Medić, Gabriel Pop, Alex Braletic, and Marc Jankovic. Šekularac's stint, though short-lived, was not without success. The club was a hit in its first season, finishing first in the International Conference with 55 points and first overall (tallying both conferences). In the regular season, Šekularac guided the club to 17 wins, 1 loss and 4 ties with a whopping goal differential of 66:13. The team finished with the best offensive and defensive record. A formidable striking partnership consisting of Pop and Viciknez was formed with Pop finishing as the league's top goalscorer followed by Viciknez as runner up. For their efforts Pop received the CSL Golden Boot, while Viciknez was named the CSL MVP.

The Eagles advanced to the knockout-stage, easily beating Toronto Supra Portuguese in the quarterfinals with a score of 3–0 and also easily defeating the Windsor Border Stars in the semifinal 6–1. Their fairy-tale season was brought to an end by the Italia Shooters in the CSL Championship final where Italia performed a miracle by scoring the lone goal to claim the championship. Though the White Eagles fell short they were embraced by the Serbian Canadian community and averaged the highest attendance of any team in the CSL.

League powerhouse and championship (2007–2008) 

Some changes were made prior to the 2007 season with starting goalkeeper Dušan Belić promoted to player-coach while Dragan Bakoč (vice-president of the club in 2006) was made president. Serbian writer Prvoslav Vujčić wrote for the club's website (in 2006 and 2007). Continuing Serbian traditions, the club chose to have a slava, eventually deciding on November 8 and Demetrius of Thessaloniki as patron saint. Belić was player-coach for a few months until he took up a scouting position in Slovenia. Belić was replaced in net by CSL veteran Arthur Zaslavski and by former Canadian under-17 international George Radan. Radan came out of an 11-year-long retirement to help the Eagles with their keeper problems. Zaslavski and Radan rotated minutes but Radan got the notch when the playoffs started nearing. Then-assistant coach Siniša Ninković (another 2006 alumnus) took up the head-coaching position but was replaced prior to the playoffs by Toronto Falcons coach Branko Pavlović. Notable acquisitions were Uroš Stamatović, Osni Neto, Ricardo Munguía Pérez, Zoran Kokot and Milan Kojić which proved to be key additions.

Throughout the season the Eagles clinched their second consecutive division title, and once more averaged the highest attendance in the CSL. Serbia had five of their players including head coach Ninković selected for the All-Star game. In the first round of the postseason they faced the Windsor Border Stars, where they advanced to the next round with Budalic, and Kokot providing the goals in a 2–1 victory. Their opponents in the next round were Trois-Rivières Attak, where Kokot and Dragorad Milićević contributed the goals in their 2–1 win. The victory marked their second consecutive championship final appearance, where they faced their rivals Toronto Croatia. Due to their heated rivalry and without an adequate stadium available in order to separate the fans, the league was forced to change the format to a two-leg game rather than the standard knockout. In the two-game final, the White Eagles were defeated by Toronto Croatia by a score of 4–1 on aggregate.

Prior to the 2008 season, the club continued its tradition of bringing over experienced coaches from Serbia as this time Milan Čančarević was made head coach. Notable imports were Caswain Mason, Darryl Gomez, Prince Ihekwoaba, Said Ali, and Diego Hernán Maradona (son of Lalo Maradona). The White Eagles qualified for the play-offs for the third straight season by finishing second in their division. In the preliminary round of the postseason they defeated the North York Astros by a score of 2–1. The Eagles then proceeded to beat the Italia Shooters in the semi-final by a relatively hefty score of 3–0 with goals coming from Budalic, Braletic, and Milos Scepanovic. In the final Serbia used a 4-4-2 formation which finally gave them championship glory as they outlasted National Division champions Trois-Rivières Attak over a rain-drenched 120 minutes of extra time and penalty kicks to win the CSL championship 2–1 in the penalty shootout.

Consistent playoff contender (2009–2012) 

In 2009, the club introduced a red jersey (blue was the secondary jersey in years previous), and hired the services of CSL Coach of the Year Rafael Carbajal. His roster was a mixture of seasoned veterans with several young prospects like Evan Milward, Selvin Lammie, and Jonathan Hurtis. Carbajal added more silverware to Serbia's cabinet as they claimed their third International Division title, while posting the league's best offensive record. Despite his success he fell out of favour with the team's management, and was released before the commencement of the postseason. His replacement was former Železničar Lajkovac forward and former head coach of Mačva Šabac Dušan Prijić. In the initial stages of the playoffs the Eagles defeated TFC Academy 6–0 on aggregate. In the next round they defeated their rivals Toronto Croatia in order to have a repeat of the 2008 final against Trois-Rivières Attak. At the final game, playing a man short for most of the second half, Trois-Rivières took the game into overtime, then penalty kicks to win the CSL Championship at the BMO Field in Toronto on October 10, 2009. The game was scoreless through 90 minutes, then 30 minutes of overtime before Trois-Rivières outscored the Serbian White Eagles 3–2 in the penalty kick decider. At the conclusion of the season Viciknez received his second MVP award, while Medić won the Defender of the Year and Dan Pelc was named the Goalkeeper of the Year.

Former team captain Niki Budalic succeeded Prijić as head coach for the 2010 season. Notable additions were Miloš Kocić, Stefan Vukovic, Daniel Baston, Taylor Lord, and Shawn Brown. During the regular season Serbia finished second in the standings with the best defensive record. In the first round of the postseason Serbia for the first time since its return to the league failed to reach the championship final after suffering a defeat by the Brantford Galaxy. Though their senior team failed to claim any silverware their reserve team won the reserve championship title. Kocić was named the CSL Goalkeeper of the Year.

Uroš Stamatović retired and was elevated as the head coach and brought in Boris Miličić. The 2011 season saw a decline in their performance as they finished fifth in the standings, but still managed to clinch a playoff berth. In the first round they defeated Brampton City United, but were eliminated in the second round against Capital City F.C. In 2012, the club once again brought in seasoned internationals like Zoran Rajović, Vitomir Jelić, Nikola Miodrag, Richard West, and Ivan Stanković. Serbia qualified for the postseason by finishing sixth in the standings. The Eagles made a good push beating a solid SC Toronto squad 1–0 in the quarterfinals only to implode 4–0 against Toronto Croatia in the next round, marking the second year in a row they were ousted in the semifinals.

Decline in performance and return to glory (2013–present) 
The following two seasons Serbia struggled to achieve sufficient results as they barely qualified for the postseason, and saw first round defeats in the playoffs. In 2015, Serbia witnessed glory once more as they claimed the regular season title. In their playoff journey to reclaim the championship they defeated London City 1–0 with Branislav Vukomanović providing the goal. Their quest for the championship came to an end after a 3–2 defeat to SC Waterloo. Former team captain Mirko Medić was assigned the head coach position for the 2016 season. He secured them their 11th straight playoff berth by finishing fourth in the standings. Their road to the championship was marked with a 1–0 victory over Toronto Atomic FC with Milos Scepanovic recording the lone goal. In the second round they defeated FC Ukraine United 1–0 in order mark their sixth championship final appearance. Their opponents in the final were Hamilton City SC. During the match, Hamilton took the lead at the 14th minute with Serbia equalizing at the 59th minute to send the match to extra time where Scepanovic scored the winner to claim Serbia's second championship title (third including NSL titles).

In June 2020, the club signed a cooperation agreement with FK Sloboda Užice.

Venue 
From 2006 to 2013, the Serbian White Eagles played their home games at Centennial Park Stadium in Etobicoke, the western portion of the city of Toronto. In 2014, they played their home games at Lamport Stadium but in 2015, they returned to Centennial Park.

Players

Current squad

Retired numbers

Notable players 

  Said Ali
  Mike Bakic
  Niki Budalic
  Adrian Cann
  Daniel Chamale
  Oscar Cordon
  Tibor Gemeri
  Alan Harvey
  Dejan Jakovic
  Milan Kojic
  Tony Lawrence
  Taylor Lord
  Evan Milward
  Nikola Paunic
  John Smits
  Mike Stojanovic
  Stefan Vukovic
  Carlos Zeballos
  Trifun Mihailović
  Ivan Mršić
  Josip Ognjanac
  Dragan Popović
  Šaban Romanović
  Dragoslav Šekularac
  Blagoje Tamindžić
  Miroslav Vardić
  Dušan Belić
  Dragan Dragutinović
  Milan Janošević
  Vitomir Jelić
  Đorđe Jocić
  Radenko Kamberović
  Miloš Kocić
  Dejan Koraksić
  Marko Krasić
  Marko Kostić
  Marko Marović
  Mirko Medić
  Dušan Mićić
  Boris Miličić
  Stefan Milošević
  Siniša Ninković
  Marko Pavićević
  Bojan Pavlović
  Zoran Pešić
  Petar Planić
  Uroš Predić
  Aleksandar Radosavljević
  Zoran Rajović
  Nemanja Simeunović
  Srđan Simović
  Uroš Stamatović
  Ivan Stanković
  Goran Švonja
  Božidar Tadić
  Adrian Tismenar
  Saša Viciknez
  Branislav Vukomanović
  Bojan Zoranović
  Pedro Kozak
  Zoran Kokot
  Miloš Đurković
  Osni Neto
  Kiril Dimitrov
  Anders Yrfeldt
  David Demaine
  Shaquille Agard
  John Dempsey
  Lascelles Dunkley
  Shawn Brown
  Richard West
  Ricardo Munguía
  Luka Bojić
  Nikola Đurković
  Božo Milić
  Dragan Radović
  Bojan Šljivančanin
  Prince Ihekwoaba
  Aleksandar Stojanovski
  Daniel Baston
  Darryl Gomez
  Caswain Mason
  John Trye
  John Fahy
  Kevin Souter
  Denny Vaninger

Club management and technical staff

Head coaches

Shirt sponsors and manufacturers

Year-by-year

Honours 
 Canadian Soccer League Championship
 2008, 2016
 Runner-up: 2006, 2007, 2009

 CSL International Division
 2006, 2007, 2009

 CSL Regular Season
 2015, 2022

 National Soccer League Championship
 Runner-up: 1972

 NSL Regular Season
 1974

 Canadian Open Cup
 1974

Gallery

Notes

References

External links 

 

 
Association football clubs established in 1968
1968 establishments in Ontario
Canadian National Soccer League teams
Canadian Soccer League (1998–present) teams
Serbian sports clubs outside Serbia
Diaspora sports clubs in Canada
Serbian-Canadian culture
Soccer clubs in Toronto
Etobicoke